North Lauderdale is a city in Broward County, Florida, United States. As of the 2020 census, the city's population was 44,794. It is a principal city of the Miami metropolitan area, which was home to an estimated 6,166,488 people in the 2020 census.

History

At its creation in 1963, it was largely farmland on the western edge of development in Broward County.  North Lauderdale was originally grazing pasture for cows and horses of the Anderson Dairy Farm and also an agricultural area for the Lena Lyons Stringbean Farm.  Recognizing a rare opportunity to work with a blank slate, famed architect Morris Lapidus turned his attention to planning a city that would become North Lauderdale.  Lapidus gained international notoriety for launching the 1950s “Miami Beach” style resort hotel.  His design of the Fontainebleau Resort, the Eden Roc and Americana helped create the style of Miami Beach.  After hotels, Lapidus turned to designing cities.  North Lauderdale, “The City of Tomorrow”, was the first city he laid out.  Residents still benefit from his influence and vision, which can be seen in the whimsical “beacons” lending the city prominence and in the distinct, amoebic shape of Boulevard of Champions.  In the late 60's, recognizing the growing demand for single-family homes, the Osias Organization, headed by Colonel Nathan Rood, who was also the first appointed Mayor, purchased most of the land and began the development of North Lauderdale proper.  In April 1969, by straw vote, Michael Saraniero became the City's first elected Mayor.

Once the city was laid out, the promise of affordable homes near the seaside ushered in a 10-year development boom in the 1970s.  Where the rich and famous flocked to Miami Beach, regular families enamored with the Sun Belt, moved to North Lauderdale.  Thousands moved in and neighborhood after neighborhood came to life.  The city's character took shape of a younger, family-oriented community where most social interaction took place after work around a softball field.  North Lauderdale is a city where a week of hard work is rewarded with sunshine-filled weekends and family barbecues.

Geography

It is adjacent to the following municipalities:

On its north:
 Margate

On its northwest:
 Coral Springs

On its west and south:
 Tamarac

On its east:
 Fort Lauderdale

On its northeast:
 Pompano Beach

Demographics

2020 census

As of the 2020 United States census, there were 44,794 people, 13,713 households, and 9,120 families residing in the city.

2010 census

As of 2010, there were 14,709 households, out of which 11.8% were vacant. In 2000, 42.4% had children under the age of 18 living with them, 46.8% were married couples living together, 19.3% had a female householder with no husband present, and 27.6% were non-families. 19.6% of all households were made up of individuals, and 5.5% had someone living alone who was 65 years of age or older. The average household size was 2.99 and the average family size was 3.43.

As of 2010, the percentage of Colombians was 3.63% of the population. It was also the 9th highest percentage Jamaican-populated area with 11.47%, while it had the 31st highest percentage of Haitians in at 6.7%, and the 38th highest percentage Trinidadian and Tobagonian community in the US, with 1.7% of the residents (tied with a few other US areas.)

2000 Census

In 2000, the city the population was spread out, with 29.9% under the age of 18, 10.7% from 18 to 24, 35.2% from 25 to 44, 17.4% from 45 to 64, and 6.9% who were 65 years of age or older. The median age was 30 years. For every 100 females, there were 94.0 males. For every 100 females age 18 and over, there were 89.0 males.

As of 2000, the median income for a household in the city was $40,050, and the median income for a family was $41,990. Males had a median income of $29,188 versus $24,828 for females. The per capita income for the city was $15,557. About 11.5% of families and 13.7% of the population were below the poverty line, including 16.9% of those under age 18 and 11.0% of those age 65 or over.

As of 2000, speakers of English as their first language accounted for 67.63% of the population, while Spanish was spoken by 20.31%, French Creole 6.16%, French 1.48%, Portuguese 1.42%, and Vietnamese speakers made up 0.89% of residents.

Media

North Lauderdale is a part of the Miami-Fort Lauderdale-Hollywood media market, which is the twelfth largest radio market and the seventeenth largest television market in the United States. Its primary daily newspapers are the South Florida Sun-Sentinel, The Miami Herald, and the alternative weekly New Times Broward-Palm Beach. There is also their Spanish-language counterparts El Sentinel and El Nuevo Herald.

Activities

Every year, during Halloween, Hampton Pines Park host the Haunted Hamptons along with the Christmas event at City Hall.

North Lauderdale Days is an annual celebration in which the city opens the pool to the public, invites vendors, and provides live music.  North Lauderdale Days is a longtime annual tradition that culminates with a fireworks display.

Education

Broward County Public Schools operates public schools. District schools in the city limits include:
 North Lauderdale PK-8 – Zoned for elementary only, serves the center-north of the city
 Silver Lakes Middle School – Serves much of the city
 Broadview Elementary School – Serves the south/southeast of the city
 Morrow Elementary School – Serves the north of the city
 Pinewood Elementary School – Serves the south and west of the city

Some sections are served by Cypress, Liberty, and Park Lakes elementary schools. Some sections are served by Lauderdale Lakes, Margate, and Millennium 6-12 Collegiate Academy middle schools.

Much of North Lauderdale is zoned to Coconut Creek High School. Other sections are zoned to Boyd Anderson, Northeast,  and Piper high schools.

There is also a charter school, Somerset Preparatory Academy Charter High At North Lauderdale.

Notable people

 Christian Thompson, former NFL one-time champion player

References

External links

 
 City of North Lauderdale official website
 North Lauderdale at City-Data.com

Cities in Broward County, Florida
Cities in Florida